The 2015 Busan Open was a professional tennis tournament played on hard courts. It was the fourteenth edition of the tournament which was part of the 2015 ATP Challenger Tour. It took place in Busan, South Korea between 4 and 10 May 2015.

Singles main-draw entrants

Seeds
* 1 Rankings are as of April 27, 2015.

Other entrants
The following players received wildcards into the singles main draw:
  Hong Seong-chan
  Lim Yong-kyu
  Nam Ji-sung
  Oh Chan-yeong

The following players were given special exempt to gain entry into the singles main draw:
  Grega Žemlja
  Franco Škugor

The following players received entry from the qualifying draw:
  Jason Jung
  Frederik Nielsen
  Dimitar Kutrovsky
  Kim Young-seok

The following player received entry from as a lucky loser:
  Matthew Barton

Doubles main-draw entrants

Seeds

1 Rankings as of April 27, 2015.

Other entrants 
The following pairs received wildcards into the singles main draw:
 Chung Hyeon /  Lim Yong-kyu
 Nam Ji-sung /  Song Min-kyu
 Chung Yun-seong /  Hong Seong-chan

Champions

Singles

 Chung Hyeon def.  Lukáš Lacko 6–3, 6–1

Doubles

  Sanchai Ratiwatana /  Sonchat Ratiwatana def.  Nam Ji-sung /  Song Min-kyu 7–6(7–2), 3–6, [10–7]

External links
Official Website

Busan Open
Busan Open
May 2015 sports events in South Korea
Busan